Army Group E (Heeresgruppe E) was a German Army Group active during World War II.

Army Group E was created on 1 January 1943 from the 12th Army. Units from this Army Group were distributed throughout the Eastern Mediterranean area, including Albania, Greece, the Territory of the Military Commander in Serbia, and the Independent State of Croatia.

Composition
Its principal units were:
11th Luftwaffe Field Division (Attica garrison) - Generalleutnant Wilhelm Kohler
Rhodes Assault Division (amalgamated with the Brandenburg Panzergrenadier Division in 1944)
LXVIII Army Corps (eastern Greece and Peloponnese)
117th Jäger Division - General der Gebirgstruppe Karl von Le Suire
1st Panzer Division (June–October 1943) - Generalmajor Walter Krüger
XXII Mountain Army Corps (western Greece) - General der Gebirgstruppe Hubert Lanz
104th Jäger Division - General der Infanterie Hartwig von Ludwiger
1st Mountain Division - Generalleutnant Walter Stettner
41st Fortress Division
Fortress Crete
22nd Division - General der Infanterie Friedrich-Wilhelm Müller
Also within the Army Group command were 22 penal "fortress battalions" of the "999" series.

Service history
The Army Group participated in anti-partisan operations in Greece and Yugoslavia. During the course of these operations, several atrocities were committed, including the massacres of Kalavryta and Distomo in Greece. Furthermore, during the disarmament of the Italian army in September 1943, German troops executed over 5,000 Italian prisoners of war in the Cephallonia Massacre. At the same time, the Army Group successfully repelled the British attempt to seize the Italian-occupied Dodecanese Islands.
Army Group troops were also involved in the Chortiatis massacre (September 1944).

Retreat from Greece 
When the fighting in Romania developed into a German defeat in the summer of 1944, Army Group E began to withdraw from the Greek islands and the mainland. The withdrawal from the southern Balkans was successful. By the end of 1944, the army group had succeeded in repelling the attacks of Soviet and Bulgarian troops as well as the Yugoslav People's Liberation Army. On the Bosnian border, it was able to establish a stable defensive position. In the autumn of 1944, the 2nd and 3rd Ukrainian Fronts, together with the Yugoslav People's Liberation Army, conquered Central Serbia as part of the Belgrade Operation. The Soviet troops were then taken to the Hungarian theatre of war. This forced the Army Group E and the 2nd Panzer Army to set off through the very mountainous terrain of southwestern Serbia, northern Montenegro and finally southeast Bosnia towards Croatia.  Throughout the journey they were left exposed to the Yugoslav Partisans' firepower, sometimes with the Allies' assistance of Floydforce.

Army Group E was joined with what was left of Maximilian von Weichs' Army Group F.  That army group had been dissolved on 25 March 1945.
In the spring of 1945, some troops were sent to Hungary, with some units moving to Austria and southern Germany. During the 1945 retreat the fortress units were amalgamated into the LXXXXI Army Corps.

Last fight in Croatia 

Colonel General Alexander Löhr tried to hold the Independent State of Croatia against the People's Liberation Army. A major offensive by the People's Liberation Army, which began on 12 April 1945, drove the German troops together in the Slovenian-Austrian border area. A few units escaped and eventually surrendered to British forces that had occupied Styria and Carinthia. Alexander Löhr reached a partial agreement with the British Commander-in-Chief to accept the German units. On the day of the surrender, 8 May 1945, the mass of the Army group was still three day marches away from the Austrian border. Until 15 May, numerous units managed to escape to Austria. 150,000 German soldiers of the Army group were captured by Tito's forces. At that time, Army Group E consisted of seven German divisions, two Cossack divisions of the XV SS Cossack Cavalry Corps and nine Croatian divisions. 220,000 members of the Croatian forces who fled to Austria with Army Group E were extradited by the British to the Tito partisans after their surrender. Several thousand of them were subsequently killed in the Bleiburg Massacre.

A member of Army Group E who later rose to prominence was Austrian president and United Nations General Secretary Kurt Waldheim, who served in the military administration of Thessaloniki.

Commanders

References

Sources
 Hogg, Ian V., German Order of Battle 1944: The regiments, formations and units of the German ground forces, Arms and Armour Press, London, 1975

 Thomas, Nigel, (Author), Andrew, Stephen, (Illustrator), The German Army 1939-45 (2) : North Africa & Balkans (Men-At-Arms Series, 316), Osprey Publishing, 1998 

E
German occupation of Greece during World War II
Military units and formations established in 1943
Military units and formations disestablished in 1945